Alexander (Alex) Keynan  (18 February 1921 – 7 May 2012) was an Israeli microbiologist. He was co-founder and the first director of Israel Institute for Biological Research.

Biography 
Alexander Kotznok (later Keynan) was born in Kiev, Ukraine to Rachel and Ephraim Kotznok (1883–1963), an industrialist, insurance agent and an active Zionist. In 1930, Keynan immigrated with his family to Mandate Palestine. He studied for a M.Sc and Ph.D. at the Hebrew University, graduating in 1950. His thesis was on the biological and biochemical studies of Clostridium botulinum. He served in the science department of the Haganah.

In 1945, Keynan married  Malka Ben-Zvi. The couple had two daughters. His paternal aunt was Bracha Peli.

Scientific and academic career
In 1948, with the establishment of the Israel Defense Forces, Keynan joined the Science Corps (חיל המדע) and  thereafter was a founding member of the Israel Institute for Biological Research in Ness Ziona and its first director. Keynan served as the Chief Scientific Director of the Institute and the director of the Institute of bacteriology.

In 1964, Keynan was appointed to the chairman position of the National Council for Research and Development. In 1967 Keynan was appointed as the head of the Institute of Life Sciences (המכון למדעי החיים) at the Hebrew University. During this period he was appointed as a member of the Atomic Energy Commission (הוועדה לאנרגיה אטומית).

Until his retirement in 1990, Keynan was a faculty member of the Hebrew University and since 1977 he was a full professor.

References

1921 births
2012 deaths
Soviet emigrants to Mandatory Palestine
Israeli microbiologists
Academic staff of the Hebrew University of Jerusalem